Ivan Saičić (born 8 February 1993) is a Serbian professional basketball player for Radnik Surdulica of the Second Basketball League of Serbia.

College career 
Saičić played his freshman season of college basketball at the Winthrop University, in their 2013–14 season. As a sophomore and junior, Saičić played for University of West Georgia from 2015 to 2017. Saičić played his senior season at the Oklahoma City University, in their 2017–18 season.

Professional career 
Saičić played for Crvena zvezda and Vršac prior he moved to the United States in 2013 to pursuit with college basketball. After he finished college career in 2018 he signed for OKK Beograd.

Saičić joined Georgian team Vera Tbilisi for the 2018–19 season. In August 2020, he signed for Napredak Junior.

References

External links
 Ivan Saicic at eurobasket.com
 Ivan Saicic at realgm.com
 Ivan Saicic at proballers.com
 Ivan Saicic at aba-liga.com
 
 Ivan Saicic at euroleague.net

1993 births
Living people
ABA League players
Basketball League of Serbia players
Basketball players from Belgrade
KK Crvena zvezda players
KK Napredak Kruševac players
KK Radnik Surdulica players
KK Vršac players
OKK Beograd players
Oklahoma City Stars men's basketball players
Serbian expatriate basketball people in Georgia (country)
Serbian expatriate basketball people in the United States
Serbian men's basketball players
Serbian men's 3x3 basketball players
Small forwards
West Georgia Wolves men's basketball players
Winthrop Eagles men's basketball players